Horiomyzon retropinnatus is a species of three-barbeled catfish which occurs in the Amazon and Napo Rivers of Brazil and Ecuador.  This species reaches a length of  SL.  It is currently the only recognized species in its genus.

References

Heptapteridae
Monotypic fish genera
Fish of South America
Fish of Ecuador
Fish of Brazil
Fish of the Amazon basin
Fish described in 1986